It's Our Time may refer to:

It's Our Time, album by Four Year Strong
"It's Our Time", song by Eddy Grant from the album Message Man